Paio is a traditional embutido sausage of Portugal and Brazil. 

Paio is made of pork loin, seasoned with garlic, salt, and Capsicum pepper and smoked. 

It is a hard sausage, usually made in a large diameter, and can be sliced and eaten on bread.  

In Brazil it is a common ingredient of the bean stew feijoada.

See also
List of sausages

Portuguese sausages
Brazilian cuisine